Busoga University (BU), is a private university in Uganda, affiliated with Central Busoga Diocese of the Church of Uganda.

Location
The coordinates of Busoga University Campus are:0°35'29.0"N, 33°27'32.0"E (Latitude:0.591389; Longitude:33.458889).

Other campuses
, in addition to the Main Campus, Busoga University maintains several other campuses, including the following:

 Jinja Campus - Jinja
 Kamuli Campus - Buwaiswa, Kamuli District
 Downtown Campus - Downtown Iganga
 Bugiri Campus - Bugiri
 Kaliro Campus - Kaliro
 Pallisa Campus -Pallisa
 Bugembe Campus - Bugembe - “Bishop Hannington School of Divinity and Theology (BHSDT)’’, a constituent School of Busoga University.

History
Busoga University was founded in 1999, following the issuance of a tertiary institutional license by the Ministry of Education and Sports. The university is a non-profit organization.

On 23 February 1993, Busoga College Mwiri’s Board of Governors, under the leadership of Bishop Cyprian K. Bamwoze passed a resolution to establish a university on the same hill and requested Busoga Diocesan Council and the House of Bishops to become the foundation body of the anticipated university. On 19 November 1994, a University Formation Task Force (UFTF) was appointed "to map out the process of establishing BU" and on 21 April 1995, it presented its report to the Bishop. On 6 May 1995, the Bishop inaugurated BU in the presence of His Royal Highness the Kyabazinga of Busoga, Henry Wako Muloki. Soon after, Busoga Diocese surrendered its Iganga land and buildings of Bishop Hannington Theological College to BU, and on 30 July, BU received its interim license. On 12 February 1999, BU opened its gates to students.

In 2017, its provisional license was revoked by  the Uganda National Council for Higher Education, but it was given permission to reapply after two years.

Affiliations

Busoga University has academic linkages with the University of Wisconsin Oshkosh, in Oshkosh, Wisconsin, United States and the University College Northampton, in Northampton, UK.

Academics

The university offers certificate, diploma, undergraduate and post-graduate courses in the following disciplines:

See also
Education in Uganda
List of universities in Uganda

References

External links
Busoga University Homepage
About Busoga University

 
1999 establishments in Uganda
Educational institutions established in 1999
Iganga District
Busoga
Anglican universities and colleges